Burgazada Synagogue is a synagogue in Burgazada, Istanbul, Turkey. There were few Jewish families in the 1950s in Burgaz (Antigone), but in the 60's the need to have a synagogue arose and permission was taken in 1968 to build one. It is open for services only during summer months, like the other synagogues of the Prince Islands.

See also
 History of the Jews in Turkey
 List of synagogues in Turkey

References and notes

External links
 Chief Rabbinate of Turkey
 Shalom Newspaper - The main Jewish newspaper in Turkey

Synagogues in Istanbul